Enrique Ruiz del Portal González (3 July 1932 in Madrid – 20 March 2020) was a Spanish tenor and actor. His career began in 1959 in Teatro de la Zarzuela. He retired in 2014. On 5 March 2020, Portal suffered a fall at his home in Madrid. He was unable to be hospitalized due to the COVID-19 pandemic. His health deteriorated and he died on 20 March from gastroenteritis, aged 87.

References

1932 births
2020 deaths
Spanish tenors
Accidental deaths from falls
Spanish male stage actors
Male actors from Madrid